Ajit Narayanan (born August 21, 1981) is the inventor of FreeSpeech, a picture language with a deep grammatical structure. He's also the inventor of Avaz, India's first Augmentative and Alternative Communication device for children with disabilities. He is a TR35 awardee (2011) and an awardee of the National Award for Empowerment of Persons with Disabilities by the President of India (2010).

Early life and education 

Ajit grew up in Chennai, India and showed an early aptitude for language and mathematics. He went on to study electrical engineering at the Indian Institute of Technology Madras (IIT Madras). During his graduation, he received the Motorola Prize for his academic and extra-curricular activities. During his time at IIT Madras, he was a part of the Institute quiz team, notably captaining the team that won the University Challenge in 2003, and editing the IIT Madras campus magazine, The Fourth Estate. Ajit subsequently moved to the United States, working for several years at American Megatrends.

FreeSpeech 

In February 2013, Ajit gave a TED talk on a new linguistic structure called FreeSpeech, and an algorithm called the FreeSpeech engine. FreeSpeech was created in response to a need felt among children with complex communication needs to communicate in multiple languages. FreeSpeech is a semantic map of pictures that represent words. These words are linked together in pairs of question/answer relationships, and have pictorial markers for tense, number etc. applied on top of them. The structure's stated aim was to capture 'meaning' rather than 'surface form' of language, and then use a set of algorithms (the FreeSpeech engine) to generate grammatical English out of it.

FreeSpeech is language-independent, meaning it uses pictures of objects, actions, and even abstract ideas like the past tense, instead of English words like "I" or "eat". Some shown on the TED talk include a bowl of soup, a person talking, and a small clock with an arrow pointing backward to signify the past tense of a verb.

FreeSpeech was tested widely among children with special needs such as autism and language impairments, to teach them grammar. It also saw use by children in the Deaf community to learn literacy—a task complicated by the unique grammatical structure of American Sign Language, which is very different from English.

Beyond applications in disability, the Indian government was in talks to license this program to use in some of its schools to teach English, through the Aakash tablet project.

Avaz 

In 2010, Ajit invented Avaz. Avaz is an Alternative and augmentative communication device. It works by generating speech from limited muscle movements like that from the head or hand, and is used people with speech disorders such as cerebral palsy, autism, intellectual disability, and aphasia.

Avaz was widely used in India as a communication device, and was subsequently converted into an app for the iPad and for Android tablets. For his invention of Avaz, Ajit received the National Award for Empowerment of Persons with Disabilities  in 2010, from the President of India.

MIT TR35 

In 2011, Ajit was named the MIT TR35 "Innovator of the Year" for India. His citation for the award mentioned his work on low-cost speech generating devices:

In 2012, Ajit was named to the global MIT TR35 list, alongside Groupon founder Andrew Mason and Microsoft Photosynth inventor Noah Snavely:

References

External links 
 https://web.archive.org/web/20160304083904/http://expressbuzz.com/cities/chennai/voice-for-the-voiceless/259683.html 
 

20th-century Indian inventors
1981 births
Living people
21st-century Indian inventors